The Mustansiriya University bombings was a series of bombing attacks at students and teachers at the largely Shiite Mustansiriya University in Baghdad, Iraq, on January 16, 2007. Some 70 people were killed and 169 were wounded.

See also
 2007 suicide bombings in Iraq

References

External links
Double bombing at university kills 60 in Baghdad Reuters
Bombings Kill 60 at University In Baghdad Washington Post
Baghdad university bombing kills 65 as U.N. reports 34,000 Iraqi civilians killed in '06 USA Today
3 Bombs Kill at Least 70 at University in Baghdad The New York Times
Iraq: after university bombing, UNESCO urges Government to defend right to education United Nations

2007 murders in Iraq
Suicide car and truck bombings in Iraq
Terrorist incidents in Iraq in 2007
Terrorist incidents in Baghdad
Mass murder in 2007
School massacres
School bombings
2000s in Baghdad
Attacks on universities and colleges
Violence against Shia Muslims in Iraq
January 2007 events in Iraq
Attacks on buildings and structures in Iraq